Werner Miller (1892–1959) was a Swiss painter.

Life
Miller's father, Oscar, was a paper manufacturer and an art collector. Werner Miller studied with Ferdinand Hodler and Cuno Amiet. One of his works is the Gstaad tourism advertisement in the main lobby of the Basel SBB railway station. Miller lived in Biberist.

References

20th-century Swiss painters
Swiss male painters
1892 births
1959 deaths
20th-century Swiss male artists